Noesis is a domain-specific search engine and open access journal for academic philosophy. The current online version is a prototype release.  Noesis may be treated as a sort of clearinghouse for scholarly e-journals in philosophy.

Noesis is currently undergoing development at Indiana University, thanks to a Digital Humanities Initiative of the National Endowment for the Humanities. The editor-in-chief is Anthony Beavers (University of Evansville).

Further reading
Beavers, Anthony, "Noesis and the encyclopedic internet vision" in Synthese, Volume 182, Issue 2 (September 2011), pp. 315–333.

References

Philosophy journals
Open access journals
Publications established in 1998